Susan L. Shirk (born  1945) is a professor at the School of Global Policy and Strategy at the University of California, San Diego. Her research field is Chinese politics.

Shirk served as Deputy Assistant Secretary of State in the Bureau of East Asia and Pacific Affairs of the US State Department from 1997 to 2000 during the Clinton administration.

Early life and education
Susan Shirk was born circa 1945. 

Shirk received a bachelor of arts with a major in political science from Mount Holyoke College at South Hadley, Massachusetts in 1967. She received a master of arts in Asian studies from the University of California, Berkeley in 1968 and a doctor of philosophy in political science from the Massachusetts Institute of Technology in 1974.

She first traveled to China in 1971 as a member of the Committee of Concerned Asian Scholars.

Career
Shirk is the Ho Miu Lam Endowed Chair of China and Pacific Relations in the School of Global Policy and Strategy at the University of California, San Diego and Director of the Institute on Global Conflict and Cooperation. She heads the Northeast Asia Cooperation Dialogue, a track II diplomatic initiative.

Selected books

Overreach: How China Derailed Its Peaceful Rise, 2022. ISBN 978-0190068516.
China: Fragile Superpower: How China's Internal Politics Could Derail Its Peaceful Rise, 2007. ISBN 978-0195373196.
How China Opened Its Door: The Political Success of the PRC's Foreign Trade and Investment Reform, 1994. ISBN 978-0815778530.
The Political Logic of Economic Reform in China, 1993. ISBN 978-0520077072.
The Challenge of China and Japan: Politics and Development in East Asia, 1985
 Competitive Comrades, 1982. ISBN 978-0030717994.

References 

United States Department of State officials
American women diplomats
American diplomats
University of California, San Diego faculty
Mount Holyoke College alumni
MIT School of Humanities, Arts, and Social Sciences alumni
University of California, Berkeley alumni
1945 births
Living people
American women political scientists
American political scientists
21st-century American women